Frank John Frederick Quinn (11 July 1893 – 20 February 1973) was an Australian rules footballer who played with St Kilda in the Victorian Football League (VFL).

Notes

External links 

1893 births
1973 deaths
Australian rules footballers from Tasmania
St Kilda Football Club players